Euphaedra janetta, the Janetta Themis forester, is a butterfly in the family Nymphalidae. It is found in Guinea, Sierra Leone, Liberia, Ivory Coast, Ghana, Togo, Benin, Nigeria, Cameroon, Equatorial Guinea, the Central African Republic and the Democratic Republic of the Congo. The habitat consists of forests.

Adults are attracted to fallen fruit.

Subspecies
E. j. janetta (Guinea, Sierra Leone, Liberia, Ivory Coast, Ghana, Togo, Benin, Nigeria, western Cameroon)
E. j. campaspoides Hecq, 1985 (Democratic Republic of the Congo, Central African Republic)
E. j. insularis Schultze, 1920 (Bioko)
E. j. remota Hecq, 1991 (Democratic Republic of the Congo: Equateur, Central African Republic)

Similar species
Other members of themis species group q.v.

References

Butterflies described in 1871
janetta
Butterflies of Africa
Taxa named by Arthur Gardiner Butler